Park Hee-jung (born October 20, 1988) is a South Korean actress and model. She is best known for her role as a protagonist in the 2014 film Another Promise. She actually shaved her head for the film.

Filmography

References

External links
 

1988 births
Living people
People from Jeonju
Dankook University alumni
21st-century South Korean actresses
South Korean film actresses